Dennis Fenton (November 20, 1888 – March 29, 1954) was an American sport shooter and Olympic champion. He was born in Ventry, Ireland, and died in San Diego, California.

In 1920 he won three gold and one bronze medal. He also participated in the 300 metre free rifle, three positions but his final placing is unknown. Four years later he won again a bronze medal. In the 1924 Summer Olympics he also participated in the following events:

 Team 100 metre running deer, double shots - fifth place
 100 metre running deer, single shots - twelfth place
 600 metre free rifle - 24th place
 100 metre running deer, double shots - 24th place

References

External links
Profile: "Dennis Fenton" databaseOlympics.com (Retrieved on January 17, 2008) 

1888 births
1954 deaths
American male sport shooters
United States Distinguished Marksman
Running target shooters
ISSF rifle shooters
Shooters at the 1920 Summer Olympics
Shooters at the 1924 Summer Olympics
Olympic gold medalists for the United States in shooting
Olympic bronze medalists for the United States in shooting
Medalists at the 1920 Summer Olympics
Medalists at the 1924 Summer Olympics
19th-century American people
20th-century American people